The Industrial and Commercial Union (ICU) was a trade union and mass-based popular political movement in southern Africa. It was influenced by the syndicalist politics of the Industrial Workers of the World (adopting the IWW Preamble in 1925), as well as by Garveyism, Christianity, communism, and liberalism.

Origins

The original ICU was founded in Cape Town in 1919. Later that year it held a famous joint strike on the docks with the syndicalist Industrial Workers of Africa, a black-based union modelled on the syndicalist Industrial Workers of the World. In 1920, the two unions merged with a number of other emergent African and Coloured-based unions into an expanded ICU with the stated aim of "creating one great union" of workers south of the Zambezi river i.e. spanning South Africa, South West Africa, Northern Rhodesia and Southern Rhodesia. The first journal of the ICWU, Black Man, ran for six issues in 1920.

The ICU has been described as "one of the most radical movements ever seen in Southern Africa." Visiting American and Caribbean sailors played a key role in the introduction of both Garveyite and syndicalist ideas. The ICU remained active in Zimbabwe into the 1950s as the Reformed Industrial Commercial Union (RICU), but had declined elsewhere by the end of the 1930s.

Development and collapse

The ICU spread into South West Africa (modern-day Namibia) in 1920, Southern Rhodesia (modern-day Zimbabwe) in 1927, and Northern Rhodesia (modern-day Zambia) in 1931. For its early years, however, South Africa was its stronghold.

The South African ICU was a general union, with a loose structure. Its operations were largely based in black urban communities and on farms, and its social base was a mixture of workers, sharecroppers and other tenant farmers, and the downwardly mobile black middle class. The ICU experienced explosive rural growth, so that by 1927 it could boast a membership of 100,000, making it one of the largest trade unions ever to have taken root in Africa before the 1970s. No movement before or since has succeeded in mobilising the South African rural poor on such a scale. While its base was increasingly rural, it also managed to make inroads into urban black communities, notably in Durban on a large scale.<ref>'The Message of the Warriors: The ICU, the labouring poor and the making of a popular political culture in Durban, 1925–1930'], Paul La Hausse, in Holding their Ground' Edited by Phil Bonner et al, 1987</ref>

The ICU's ideology was an unstable mixture, and the movement developed highly unevenly. At times, ICU leaders promoted a radical vision of workers and tenant farmers taking over white farms. In the late 1920s the movement took on a millenarian aspect in the rural Eastern Cape where predictions of airborne liberation by African Americans captured the imagination of thousands of people. Yet the ICU also made extensive, and often successful, use of the (white-run) courts. In the late 1920s, the South African ICU briefly sought to reposition itself as a moderate, orthodox trade union.

There was some overlap of membership between the ICU and the then-moderate (and tiny) African National Congress, but the two bodies were often rivals, despite several ICU attempts to influence Congress. Members of the Communist Party of South Africa played an important role in the early ICU, but were expelled in 1926.

By the late 1920s the South African ICU faced severe repression, especially the eviction of activists from white farms and laws enabling crackdowns on key figures. This repression was enabled by the Industrial Conciliation Act, 1924, which exempted non-whites from labor laws and refused them legal recognition as employees. Meanwhile, the union had severe internal weaknesses, including unaccountable leaders, corruption and a lack of clear strategy. In 1928 the union was still able to play a major role in the famous women's beer hall boycott in Durban, where in the 1930s the union had its own hall in Prince Edward Street in Durban, and undertook mass marches through the suburb of Sydenham.

The Zimbabwean ICU faced similar challenges, but grew quite rapidly into the 1930s, emerging as a major black political force. Like the South African ICU, it had a large rural base, as well as an influence in black urban areas. It experienced some decline, but continued to operate in the form of the Reformed ICU into the mid-1950s. In Zambia, ICU groups were active from 1931, but never attained the size and power of the two southern ICUs. In Namibia, the ICU was mainly active in the port town of Lüderitz.

In 1935 Rachel Simons was the secretary of the union.

Analysts and currents sympathetic to an autonomous and self-directed politics of the poor are increasingly revisiting the history of the ICU.

Further reading

Websites
Industrial and Commercial Union of Africa Timeline at SA History.Org – a chronology dealing with the South African ICU.
Allison Wessels George Champion at SA History.Org – profile of Durban ICU leader A.W.G. Champion.
Clements Kadalie at SA History.Org – profile of South African ICU leader Clements Kadalie.
Stanley Trapido interviews A.W.G. Champion, 1963, SA History Online – an interview with the elderly A.W.G. Champion.

Articles

 Bonner, P. Division and Unity in the Struggle: African Politics on the Witwatersrand in the 1920s. , unpublished African Studies Seminar Paper, Wits University, 1992.
 Bradford, H. Class Contradictions and Class Alliances: The Social Nature of ICU Leadership, 1924–1929. , African Studies Seminar Paper, Wits University, 1983.
 La Hausse, P. The Message of the Warriors: The ICU, the labouring poor and the making of a popular political culture in Durban, 1925–1930, conference paper, 1987, later republished in P. Bonner etal (eds),  Holding their Ground, Ravan Press, Johannesburg.
 Tricontinental: Institute for Social Research, 2019 A Brief History of South Africa’s Industrial and Commercial Workers’ Union (1919-1931)
 van der Walt, L., 2007, The First Globalisation and Transnational Labour Activism in Southern Africa : white labourism, the IWW and the ICU, 1904–1934, African Studies journal, Vol 66, Issues 2/3, pp. 223–251.
 van der Walt, L., 2011, Anarchism and Syndicalism in an African Port City:  the revolutionary traditions of Cape Town's multiracial working class, 1904–1931, Labor History journal, Volume 52, Issue 2, pp. 137–171.

Books

 Bradford, H., A Taste of Freedom: the ICU in rural South Africa, 1924–1930. Raven Press, Johannesburg, 1987.
 Kadalie, C., My Life and the ICU: The Autobiography of a Black Trade Unionist in South Africa. Humanities Press, New York, 1970.
 Karis, T. & Carter, G. M.,  From Protest to Challenge: A Documentary History of African Politics in South Africa, 1882–1964, Vol. 2, Hope and challenge, Hoover Institution Press: Stanford University, California, 1972. Includes 1925 ICU constitution.
 Roux, E., Time Longer than Rope: A History of the Black Man’s Struggle for Freedom in South Africa. University of Wisconsin Press, Madison, 1964.
 Swanson, MM., The Views of Mahlathi, 1983. The views of Durban ICU leader, A.W.G. Champion
 Lucien van der Walt and Michael Schmidt, Black Flame: The Revolutionary Class Politics of Anarchism and Syndicalism (Counter-Power vol. 1), AK Press, 2009,
 Walker, I. L & Weinbren, B., 2000 Casualties: A History of the trade unions and the labour movement in the union of South Africa'', Natal Witness: Pietermaritzburg, 1961. Includes sections on ICU, and South African ICU leader Clements Kadalie.

References

Defunct trade unions in South Africa
Trade unions established in 1919
Shack dwellers' movements
Squatters' movements
Industrial Workers of the World in South Africa
Syndicalism in South Africa
Syndicalist trade unions